The 1961 Campeonato Profesional was the 14th season of Colombia's top-flight football league. 12 teams competed against one another. Millonarios won the league for the 6th time in its history after getting 62 points.

Background
11 teams from the last tournament competed in this one, with Unión Magdalena declining to participate and both Deportes Caldas and Once Deportivo merging into Once Caldas. Millonarios won the championship for the sixth time. The runners-up were Independiente Medellín.

League system
Every team played four games against each other team, two at home and two away. Teams received two points for a win and one point for a draw. If two or more teams were tied on points, places were determined by goal difference. The team with the most points is the champion of the league.

Teams

Final standings

Results

First turn

Second turn

Top goalscorers

Source: RSSSF.com Colombia 1961

References

External links 
Dimayor Official Page

1961 in Colombian football
Colombia
Categoría Primera A seasons